Four Red Roses (Italian: Quattro rose rosse) is a 1952 Italian historical melodrama film directed by Nunzio Malasomma and starring Olga Villi, Jean-Claude Pascal and Fosco Giachetti. A melodrama, it is set during the early years of the twentieth century.

The film's sets were designed by the art directors Piero Filippone and Mario Rappini. It earned around 136 million lira at the box office.

Plot 
In the early years of the twentieth century, during horse racing, a banker fails to conquer a model spotted by an already engaged boy and, in revenge, he makes the latter believe that he has conquered her and warns his girlfriend of her betrayal. The young man is challenged to a duel by her brother, but before the fight he manages to obtain evidence (which will later prove to be bogus) of the woman's betrayal. Several years later, the protagonists will meet again; when all things seem to be smoothed out, the banker's sudden jealousy sets off tragedy.

Main cast
 Olga Villi as Luisa
 Jean-Claude Pascal as Pietro Leandri
 Fosco Giachetti as Antonio Berti
 Valerie Darc as Colette
 Aldo Nicodemi as 	Massimo, fratello di Luisa
 Bianca Maria Fusari as Carla
 Carlo Ninchi as Gustavo Leandri
 Margherita Bagni as Signora Tonelli

References

Bibliography

External links 
 

1952 films
Italian historical drama films
1950s Italian-language films
Films directed by Nunzio Malasomma
Films set in the 1900s
1950s historical drama films
1950s Italian films